Udo Bölts (born 10 August 1966) is a retired German racing cyclist, the brother of Hartmut Bölts. Bölts confessed publicly in 2007 to having used EPO and growth hormones in 1996 and 1997.

Biography

From 1992 to 2003, Bölts took part in 12 consecutive Tours de France, arriving in Paris on every occasion, both of which feats are German records. These records have since been surpassed by Jens Voigt. His best placing in the hardest stage race in the world was in 1994, when he was ninth. In 1996 and 1997, he was an important helper of teammates and eventual winners of the Tour, Bjarne Riis and Jan Ullrich. During the 1997 Tour, he was noted for the words he shouted to Ullrich when the latter was about to crack: Quäl dich, du Sau! (force yourself, you sod!). After Bölts had taken part in the Ironman Hawaii event with little preparation, his team chief of many years, Walter Godefroot, said:  "Bölts is strong, he never breaks down".

Some of his victories include three German road national titles (1990, 1995 and 1999), the Clásica de San Sebastián in 1996 or a stage win at the 1992 Giro d'Italia. He also is the only German rider to have won the Dauphiné Libéré, which he did in 1997, a year in which he was also fourth in the World Cycling Championships.

After he retired in 2004, he became one of the team's directeurs sportif, and was responsible for race preparations, strategies and contacts with other teams and cyclists. During the Tour de France 2006, he was an assistant commentator for German TV channel ZDF.

In the wake of the 2007 Team T-Mobile scandal Bölts confessed publicly on 23 May, having used EPO and growth hormones in preparation for the Tour the France 1996, continuing with the practise in 1997.

Major results

1987
 6th Overall Grand Prix Guillaume Tell
1989
 3rd Overall Herald Sun Tour
1st Stage 2
1990
 1st  Road race, National Road Championships
 1st  Overall Herald Sun Tour
 2nd Grand Prix de Cannes
 6th Grand Prix de Cholet – Pays de Loire
 10th Overall Tour Méditerranéen
1991
 3rd Overall Herald Sun Tour
 6th Overall Nissan Classic
 8th Overall Tour Méditerranéen
 10th Overall Tour de Suisse
1992
 1st Stage 19 Giro d'Italia
 1st Stage 3 Tour of the Basque Country
 4th Grand Prix Eddy Merckx
 6th GP Ouest–France
 7th Giro di Lombardia
 9th Coppa Bernocchi
1993
 3rd Overall Herald Sun Tour
 3rd Omloop van de Westhoek
 6th Telekom Grand Prix (with Jens Heppner)
 9th Overall Tirreno–Adriatico
1994
 1st Rund um Köln
 1st Omloop van de Westhoek
 Herald Sun Tour
1st Stages 8 & 9 
 2nd Grand Prix de Wallonie
 6th Overall Setmana Catalana de Ciclisme
 7th Telekom Grand Prix (with Andreas Kappes)
 8th Giro di Lombardia
 9th Overall Tour de France
 9th Overall Tour of the Basque Country
1995
 1st  Road race, National Road Championships
 6th Telekom Grand Prix (with Jens Heppner)
1996
 1st Clásica de San Sebastián
 2nd Overall Vuelta a Castilla y León
1st Stage 5 
 3rd Road race, National Road Championships
 6th Overall Grand Prix du Midi Libre
 7th Overall Tour de Suisse
1st Stage 7 
 7th Telekom Grand Prix (with Christian Henn)
 9th Overall Critérium du Dauphiné Libéré
 9th Klasika Primavera
 10th Overall Regio-Tour
1997
 1st  Overall Critérium du Dauphiné Libéré
1st  Mountains classification 
 1st Grand Prix of Aargau Canton
 1st Stage 5 Euskal Bizikleta
 3rd Overall Vuelta a Castilla y León
 4th Road race, UCI Road World Championships
 4th Breitling Grand Prix (with Christian Henn)
 7th Overall Grand Prix Guillaume Tell
 8th Rund um den Henninger-Turm
1998
 1st Grand Prix de Wallonie
 1st Breitling Grand Prix (with Christian Henn)
 2nd Klasika Primavera
 5th Overall Grand Prix Guillaume Tell
 7th Road race, National Road Championships
 8th Rund um den Henninger-Turm
 9th Clásica de San Sebastián
 10th Road race, UCI Road World Championships
 10th Tre Valli Varesine
1999
 1st  Road race, National Road Championships
 6th La Flèche Wallonne
 6th Klasika Primavera
 9th Liège–Bastogne–Liège
 10th Overall Tour of the Basque Country
 10th Overall Grand Prix du Midi Libre
 10th Breitling Grand Prix (with Christian Henn)
2000
 1st Stage 1 (TTT) Tour de Suisse
 2nd Klasika Primavera
 3rd Overall Deutschland Tour
1st Stage 3 
 6th Rund um Köln
2001
 7th Rund um den Henninger-Turm
 8th Overall Deutschland Tour
 9th Klasika Primavera
2003
 7th Overall Bayern-Rundfahrt

Grand Tour general classification results timeline

See also
 List of doping cases in cycling
 List of sportspeople sanctioned for doping offences

References

External links
Team Gerolsteiner profile

1966 births
Living people
People from Rodalben
German male cyclists
German cycling road race champions
German Giro d'Italia stage winners
German sportspeople in doping cases
Doping cases in cycling
Cycling announcers
Tour de Suisse stage winners
Cyclists from Rhineland-Palatinate
20th-century German people